The Dholi Bhil are a clan of the Bhil ethnic community and are indigenous to the current state of Rajasthan, India.

Social status 
, the Dholi Bhil were classified as a Scheduled Tribe under the Indian government's reservation program of positive discrimination.

References 

Scheduled Tribes of Rajasthan
Bhil clans